The Shadow Ministry of Barry O'Farrell was the opposition led by Barry O'Farrell MLA, opposing the Iemma, Rees and Keneally governments of the Labor Party in the Parliament of New South Wales. The shadow cabinet was made up of members of the Liberal Party and the National Party of Australia in a Coalition agreement. 

O'Farrell led from the majority Coalition partner, the Liberal Party and served as leader of the opposition from 4 April 2007 until the 2011 state election. The deputy leader of the shadow ministry during this period was Andrew Stoner MLA from the minority Coalition partner, the National Party. The leader of the opposition in the Legislative Council was Mike Gallacher MLC from the Liberal Party and the deputy leader of the Legislative Council was Duncan Gay MLC from the National Party.

Final arrangement

Shadow ministers from the Legislative Assembly

Shadow ministers from the Legislative Council

See also
2011 New South Wales state election 
O'Farrell ministry
Iemma ministry (2007–08)
Keneally ministry
Rees ministry

References

New South Wales-related lists
O'Farrell